William Large (2 July 1937 – 15 March 2006) was an English professional golfer. He was born in Liverpool, where his father, Bill Large, Sr., was professional at the Allerton Municipal course. His father had won the Northern Professional Championship in 1928.

Large's first important win was in the Honda Foursomes Tournament in 1966 where he and his partner, Jimmy Hitchcock, beat the experienced pair of Peter Alliss and Christy O'Connor Snr in the final. He was joint winner of two individual tournaments, the 1966 Martini International and the 1968 Alcan International.

Tournament wins
1965 Honda Foursomes Tournament (with Jimmy Hitchcock)
1966 Martini International (shared title with Peter Alliss)
1968 Alcan International (shared title with Christy O'Connor Snr)

Results in major championships

Note: Large only played in The Open Championship.

CUT = missed the half-way cut (3rd round cut in 1968 and 1970 Open Championships)
"T" indicates a tie for a place

References

External links

English male golfers
Sportspeople from Liverpool
1937 births
2006 deaths